María Luisa Cáceres Díaz de Arismendi (September 25, 1799 – June 2, 1866) was a heroine of the Venezuelan War of Independence.

The beginning of the war
Luisa was born in Caracas, Venezuela, to José Domingo Cáceres and Carmen Díaz, prosperous Criollos. On her father's side, she was of Canarian descent. She was baptized in the Church of Santa Rosalía, in Caracas. Her father was an intellectual, a historian and a professor of Latin. Educated by her father, Luisa learned how to read and write, and developed a love for her country. While Luisa was a young girl focussing on her studies, Spain was taken over by Napoleon, who installed his brother, Joseph, as its king. People not just in Spain, but in its colonies as well, were infuriated, and a war for Spain's independence broke out. In Venezuela, Spanish colonists saw this as an opportunity to break away from Spain while it was weak, and gain independence, and so a series of uprisings occurred. They were led by the Venezuelan marshal Francisco de Miranda, who had been involved in the French Revolution and the American Revolutionary War. Venezuela declared itself independent from Spain on July 5, 1811. This triggered the war for Venezuela's independence. The 1812 Caracas earthquake occurred where Luisa and her family were living, completely destroying the city. Because of this earthquake and a rebellion by the Venezuelan Llaneros and Canarians, the First Republic of Venezuela was toppled. A second Venezuelan republic was proclaimed on August 7, 1813, but lasted only a few months before it, too, was crushed.

On Christmas Eve 1813, Luisa met General Juan Bautista Arismendi, a scion of the illustrious Arismendi family, who was impressed by her wit. On March 6, 1814, the royalist troops of Francisco Rosete attacked Ocumare, killing her father, who was visiting his friend, Commandant Juan José Toro. Juan Bautista Arismendi organized an expedition to Ocumare, to rescue imprisoned patriots; Luisa's brother, Félix, joined the expeditionary force but was captured and, a few days later, executed. José Tomás Boves forced the patriot troops to abandon Caracas. The retreat (known in Venezuela as the Migration to the East) was led by Simón Bolívar and José Félix Ribas. Luisa's family decided to emigrate to Isla Margarita, where Arismendi offered security. During the trip, four of her aunts died, and only she, her mother, and her younger brother survived. The emigrants passed through the cities of Barcelona and Cumaná, which was taken over by Boves.

In Margarita, Arismendi located the Cáceres family, whom he had known for some time and provided them with clothing, housing, and other necessities. He and Luisa married on December 4, 1814, in La Asunción, when he was thirty-nine years of age and she fifteen. In 1815, Juan was made provisional governor of Margarita, at the same time Pablo Morillo, a royalist general, with a squad that had never been seen of the coast of Venezuela. In September, the Spanish ordered the apprehension of Juan, who consequently sought refuge in the mountains of Copey. On September 24, the pregnant Luisa was captured by the Spanish in order to exert pressure on her husband. She was kept under house arrest at the residence of the Amnés family, but was later transferred to a dungeon in the Fortress of Santa Rosa.

Imprisonment

It was in that dark dungeon that Luisa began to be harassed and abused by the Spanish soldiers. She was under strict surveillance, and given poor food, and began to experience malnutrition. She spent many days and nights without much movement, so that she wouldn't call the attention of her jailer. However, the chaplain began to feel for her, and started bringing her better food, and even lit up the cell so she could have some light. On January 26, 1816, Luisa gave birth to a daughter; however the baby died quickly after birth, due to the poor conditions her mother was in during her last few months of pregnancy.

The brigadier generals, Juan Bautista Pardo and Salvador Moxó ordered Luisa to be transferred to the Castillo San Carlos de Borromeo in Pampatar. Then she was sent to a prison in La Guaira, and then to El Convento de la Inmaculada Concepción, a convent in Caracas. Throughout the entire time of her confinement, she was unable to communicate with any family or friends.

Leaving the country 

Due to the victories of the republican army, led by her husband in Margarita and the general José Antonio Páez in Apure, Moxó ordered Luisa to be sent to Cádiz, in Spain. She was returned to La Guaira on November 24, 1816, from where she embarked on December 3. On the way, the ship she was on was attacked by a privateering vessel, and she and other passengers were stranded on Santa Maria Island, in the Azores. Luisa finally arrived at Cádiz on January 17, 1817. She was presented to the captain general of Andalusia. He protested against the arbitrary decision of the Spanish authorities in the Americas, and gave Luisa the category of being confined. He gave Luisa a pension of 10 reales a day, and is given protection by the doctor José María Morón and his wife, Concepción Pepet. They paid a deposit and agreed to present her monthly before a judge.

During her time at Cádiz, Luisa refused to sign a document stating her loyalty to the king of Spain, and denying her affiliation as a patriot of Venezuela; she never abandoned her independentist ideals. She still had no news of either her mother or her husband. In March 1818, Lieutenant Francisco Carabaña and an Englishman, Mr. Tottem, offered to help Luisa get back to the Americas. As they planned her escape, Luisa promised that her husband would pay all the expenses in the end. Luisa said her goodbyes to the Morón family, and headed to the United States of America on a frigate.

On May 3, 1818, Luisa arrived at the city of Philadelphia. There, she met the family of the patriotic general Lino Clemente, who had moved to the United States. They provided her with hospitality and friendship, just as the Morón family had in Spain. Colonel Luis Rieux, sent by Luisa's husband, went to Philadelphia to transfer her to Margarita. They arrived on July 26, 1818. Subsequently, on September 19, 1819, the Council of the Indies dictated a resolution by means of which Luisa was granted absolute liberty to choose her residence. She went on to have a total of eleven children. She continued to support the ideas of freedom and sovereignty of the people of the Americas. She lived in the city of Caracas until her death in 1866.

Honors 

In recognition of her loyalty and fight for the independence of Venezuela, her remains were entombed in the Panteón Nacional in 1876; she was the first woman to be given this honor.
A statue of her was erected in a plaza, named after her, in the small town of La Asunción, where she was married.
Today, in Caracas, there is the University Institute Luisa Cáceres de Arismendi.
She is pictured on the Venezuelan Bs.F 20 banknote, which was introduced by Hugo Chávez on January 1, 2008.
A Boeing 747-300 aircraft of Emtrasur Cargo was nicknamed after her.

Gallery

See also
History of Venezuela

References

External links 

Venezuela Tuya (Spanish)
Mi Punto (Spanish)

1799 births
1866 deaths
People from Caracas
Women in the Venezuelan War of Independence
Women in 19th-century warfare
Women in war in South America
Burials at the National Pantheon of Venezuela